Park Yeong-cheol (born 16 April 1969) is a South Korean butterfly swimmer. He competed in three events at the 1988 Summer Olympics.

References

External links
 

1969 births
Living people
South Korean male butterfly swimmers
Olympic swimmers of South Korea
Swimmers at the 1988 Summer Olympics
Place of birth missing (living people)